George Alfred Godding  (3 May 1896 – 18 November 1960) was a Welsh international footballer.

Godding played for Wrexham from 1922–1923.

He was part of the Wales national football team, playing 2 matches. He played his first match on 17 March 1923 against Scotland  and his last match on 14  April 1923 against Ireland.

See also
 List of Wales international footballers (alphabetical)

References

1896 births
1960 deaths
Wrexham A.F.C. players
Welsh footballers
Wales international footballers
Association footballers not categorized by position
Footballers from Cheshire